Scopula flaccata is a moth of the  family Geometridae. It is found in the Palestinian Territories, Israel, North Africa and has recently been recorded from southern Europe (including Spain and Malta).

Subspecies
Scopula flaccata flaccata (Palestina)
Scopula flaccata languidata (Prout, 1913) (Algeria)

References

Moths described in 1898
flaccata
Moths of Asia
Moths of Africa
Moths of Europe